Jack Waldman (September 6, 1952 – May 17, 1986) was a jazz and rock musician, composer, producer, vocalist and multi-instrumentalist born in Perth Amboy, New Jersey.

Waldman was best known for his studio work and performances with singer Robert Palmer, and also worked with artists such as Billy Idol, Madonna, Rob Hegel, Joe Jackson, Foreigner and Whitney Houston. He was classically trained from childhood, and played keyboards, synthesizer, bassoon, saxophone and flute. He died in 1986 from HIV-related lymphoma.

Personal history
Jack Waldman was born September 6, 1952 in Perth Amboy, New Jersey, and grew up in Metuchen, New Jersey. He began classical piano lessons at the age of five, and had perfect pitch.  In his teenage years, Waldman switched his focus from classical to jazz piano, studying with Morris Nanton. After attending Metuchen High School, which created the Jack Waldman Memorial Scholarship in his honor, Waldman studied at Rutgers College, Livingston College and Juilliard School of Music between 1970 and 1974. Waldman graduated in 1974 with a BA in Music from Rutgers.  After college, he relocated to New York City, where he remained until his death in 1986 from HIV-related lymphoma.

Music career
After relocating to New York in 1974, Waldman met and performed with jazz guitarist Joe Beck.  He quickly became a prolific studio musician, playing keyboards and synthesizer with well-known artists and producing remixes for single releases. Concurrently, Waldman worked on a number of independent musical projects, including Tornader with Larry Alexander, and the more noteworthy Air Force 1 with Elliot Sokolov. Waldman and Sokolov co-wrote and produced "See the Light / Feel the Heat," released in 1984 on Streetwise records, in which they sampled public domain clips of then-president Ronald Reagan.  The piece, also known as the "Ronald Reagan Rap," was one of the earliest records featuring entirely sampled vocals.  In 1984, MTV aired a video promotion for the piece.  Early in his career, Waldman began recording and performing with rock artist Robert Palmer.  Waldman's first release with Palmer was Secrets in 1979, and they continued working together throughout the 1980s.  Waldman also worked with more avant-garde performance artists, including Klaus Nomi. He did arrangements for Nomi, who mixed synth-driven new wave, 1920s German cabaret music, disco and opera. Other noteworthy artists with whom Waldman worked include Gloria Gaynor, Joe Jackson, Billy Idol, Rob Hegel, Foreigner, Aretha Franklin, Madonna, and Whitney Houston.

Discography
Appears on:
1977: Glorious, Gloria Gaynor
1979: Niteflyte, Niteflyte
1979: Secrets, Robert Palmer
1980: Clues, Robert Palmer
1980: Hegel, Rob Hegel
1980: Ding Dong, Klaus Nomi
1982: Maybe It's Live, Robert Palmer
1982: Night and Day, Joe Jackson
1982: Simple Man, Klaus Nomi
1983: Encore!, Klaus Nomi
1983: Pride, Robert Palmer
1983: Rebel Yell, Billy Idol
1983: Rhythm of Life, Paul Haig
1983: Secret, Classix Nouveaux
1984: Agent Provocateur, Foreigner
1984: Feeling Cavalier, Ēbn-Ōzn
1984: Sapphire, John Martyn
1984: See The Light, Air Force 1
1984: Snap, Peter Brown
1984: Some People, Belouis Some
1984: The Mexican, Jellybean John "Jellybean" Benitez
1984: Wotupski!?!, Jellybean John "Jellybean" Benitez 	
1984: Visitors, Motoharu Sano
1985: Cierta Gente, Belouis Some
1985: Love's Gonna Get You, Jocelyn Brown
1985: Riptide, Robert Palmer
1985: Some People, Belouis Some
1985: Surprise, Surprise, Various artists	
1985: The Sun Always Shines on T.V., a-ha
1985: What The Papers Say, Bad Manners
1985: When Midnight Comes, Surgin'
1985: Who's Zoomin' Who, Aretha Franklin
1986: Frantic Romantic, Jermaine Stewart
1986: Shakey's Got The Blues, Seven Windows
1987: Holiday / Over And Over, Madonna
1987: One From The Heart, Jocelyn Brown
1987: Whitney, Whitney Houston
1987: You Can Dance, Madonna
1988: Love Will Save The Day, Whitney Houston
1989: 45 R.P.M. Club, a-ha
1989: Addictions Volume 1, Robert Palmer
2002: The Definitive, Foreigner
2007: Electro Funk Sessions, Various Artists
2008: Body Language Six'', Various Artists

References

External links
 
 

1952 births
1986 deaths
Metuchen High School alumni
Rutgers University alumni
Juilliard School alumni
People from Metuchen, New Jersey
People from Perth Amboy, New Jersey
American music arrangers
AIDS-related deaths in New York (state)
20th-century American musicians
20th-century American male musicians